Tannertown is an extinct town in Central Pennsylvania with possible significant historical importance.  It lies between the small villages of Forest Hill and Cowan on Buffalo Road (Pennsylvania Route 192) in West Buffalo Township, Pennsylvania.

Recently Mayor Doug Richard has been working to resurrect this small town and uncover its vibrant history.

Former populated places in Pennsylvania